Volker Koepp (born 22 June 1944) is a German documentary film producer.

Early life
Koepp was born in Stettin, a German port city then subjected to a sustained campaign of bombing during World War II. By the time the city was taken over by the Red Army in April 1945, Stettin was virtually deserted, with approximately 6,000 ethnic Germans remaining. Following the ethnic cleansing of the native population after May 1945 Stettin became a Polish city. Koepp's early schooling came in Berlin. Koepp passed his school leaving exam in 1962 in Dresden, German Democratic Republic. On leaving school Koepp trained as a machinist, emerging with a qualification certificate from the Dresden Turbine Factory in 1963. He then studied for two years at the Dresden University of Technology.

From 1965 to 1969 Koepp studied at the Filmuniversität Babelsberg in Potsdam-Babelsberg. Shortly before his graduation, he was deregistered because the authorities noticed his friendship with Thomas Brasch, who had distributed leaflets opposing the Warsaw Pact invasion of Czechoslovakia. Despite his designation as a dissident, former fellow students remember Koepp as a dedicated member of the Free German Youth leadership at the academy, committed to the exposure and expulsion of students identified as guilty of false political motives. He produced a student film called: We have already built an entire city (Wir haben schon eine ganze Stadt gebaut) in 1968, and in 1969 received his degree as a director and script-writer.

Career 
Koepp was given a permanent position with DEFA, the East German state-owned film studio, as a documentary film producer in 1970, although he was subject to Stasi oversight and mistrust, particularly with regard to travel restrictions. Koepp produced several long-running documentary sequences, including a series concerning young female workers at a hosiery factory in Wittstock produced between 1974 and 1997, and a series of "landscape films". In 1984 he was awarded the Findling Award for his Leben in Wittstock.

Following the closure of DEFA after German reunification in 1990, Koepp worked as a freelance director, producer and scriptwriter.

Filmography

References

German documentary film directors
Members of the Academy of Arts, Berlin
Officers Crosses of the Order of Merit of the Federal Republic of Germany
1944 births
Living people
Film people from Szczecin
People from the Province of Pomerania